The Ebelsberg Formation is a geologic formation in Austria. It preserves fossils dated to the Chattian to Aquitanian ages of the Oligocene to Miocene epochs.

See also 
 List of fossiliferous stratigraphic units in Austria

References 

Geologic formations of Austria
Miocene Series of Europe
Oligocene Series of Europe
Neogene Austria
Paleogene Austria
Aquitanian (stage)
Chattian Stage
Shale formations
Mudstone formations
Paleontology in Austria